Nigel Smith (born 31 January 1964 in Redhill, Surrey) is a retired British alpine skier who competed in the 1988 Winter Olympics.

External links
 sports-reference.com
 

1964 births
Living people
British male alpine skiers
Olympic alpine skiers of Great Britain
Alpine skiers at the 1988 Winter Olympics
People from Redhill, Surrey
Sportspeople from Surrey
20th-century British people